Lockyer Waters is a rural locality in the Lockyer Valley Region, Queensland, Australia.

Geography 

The land use is a mix of rural residential and agricultural use, predominantly grazing on native vegetation.

History 
The name Lockyer Waters was approved by Governor in Council 22 May 1992. The name was derived from Lockyer Creek, which was probably named by Allan Cunningham in July 1829, after Major Edmund Lockyer.

Amenities 

The Alex Geddes Memorial Hall on the corner of Markai Road and Topaz Crescent is available for community events. A children's playground is located beside it.

The Lockyer Waters Rural Fire Brigade is located at 17 Topaz Crescent.

Education 
There are no schools in Lockyer Waters. The nearest primary schools are Kentville State School in neighbouring Kentville to the south-east, Mount Tarampa State School in neighbouring Mount Tarampa to the east and Lake Clarendon State School in Lake Clarendon to the south-west. The nearest secondary schools are Lowood State High School in Lowood to the east and Lockyer District State High School in Gatton to the south-west.

References 

Lockyer Valley Region
Localities in Queensland